The first season of High School Musical: The Musical: The Series, an American mockumentary musical drama streaming television created by Tim Federle, premiered on Disney Channel, ABC, and Freeform as a preview simulcast on November 8, 2019, ahead of its premiere on Disney+ on November 12. The season consisted of 10 episodes, which released weekly until January 10, 2020. The series itself is inspired by the High School Musical film series. 

In this season, the East High drama club is formed and auditions begin for the school's production of High School Musical. As the students begin to build relationships with each other, they must learn to work together to succeed.

In October 2019, before the season premiered, Disney+ renewed the series for a second season.

Episodes

Cast and characters

Main 
 Olivia Rodrigo as Nini Salazar-Roberts
 Joshua Bassett as Ricky Bowen
 Matt Cornett as E.J. Caswell
 Sofia Wylie as Gina Porter
 Larry Saperstein as Big Red
 Julia Lester as Ashlyn Caswell
 Dara Reneé as Kourtney Greene
 Frankie Rodriguez as Carlos Rodriguez
 Mark St. Cyr as Benjamin Mazzara
 Kate Reinders as Miss Jenn

Recurring 
 Joe Serafini as Seb Matthew-Smith
 Alexis Nelis as Natalie Bagley
 Michelle Noh as Dana
 Jeanne Sakata as Malou
 Alex Quijano as Mike Bowen

Guest 
 Nicole Sullivan as Carol
 Valente Rodriguez as Principal Gutierrez
 Kaycee Stroh as Kaycee
 Beth Lacke as Lynne Bowen
 Lucas Grabeel as himself

Production

Development 

Federle pitched the documentary-style series in January 2018, joining the production in May, and would go on to draft the pilot together with Disney Channel, who contributed to the production of the series. On September 6, Disney officially gave the production a series order for a first season consisting of ten episodes. Oliver Goldstick was expected to serve as showrunner and an additional executive producer while Julie Ashton would oversee the casting process. Alongside this announcement, it was also revealed that the show would be of the mockumentary genre and a list of character names and descriptions was released. By May 2019, Goldstick had departed the series over "creative differences", having served as showrunner for the first four episodes.

When talking about the inspiration for the series, Federle noted, "I was always thinking about the original fans, whose childhood I promise I’m not trying to ruin...it’s a fresh start and brand-new cast, and I want to tell stories that went totally outside the High School Musical universe and engage people in a new way." Federle noted his love for mockumentary series like The Office and Waiting for Guffman and spoke of the inspiration for his series, "It was right at the height of American Vandal, which I thought was incredible and brilliantly done. And I wanted to differentiate us from the original [movies] right away. I knew that camera-style-wise, if I could borrow some of the elements from The Office, with characters talking to the camera and whip pans and zooms, it would immediately announce it as not a copycat of the original, but a new way in. And the docu-style would allow me to revisit the original music but not feel like we’re doing direct karaoke covers."

Casting 

On October 17, 2018, it was announced that Joshua Bassett had been cast in a leading role. The rest of the cast was announced on February 15, 2019, including Sofia Wylie, Kate Reinders, and Olivia Rodrigo. Federle confirmed in November 2019 that an unnamed cast member from the original film would make a cameo appearance through a fantasy sequence. After being listed as a featured artist on the soundtrack, Lucas Grabeel, who played Ryan Evans, was confirmed to be making an appearance on the series.

Music

The soundtrack for the first season consists of original songs written for the series and new versions of songs from the film High School Musical. Olivia Rodrigo wrote a song for the season, "All I Want," and co-wrote a song with fellow cast member Joshua Bassett and producer Dan Book. The soundtrack was released to all music streaming services and physical media on January 10, 2020.

Reception

Critical response 
The review aggregator website Rotten Tomatoes reported a 75% approval rating for the first season with an average rating of 7.38/10 based on 32 ratings. The website's critical consensus reads, "Though fans may find what they've been looking for in its nostalgic stylings, High School Musical: The Musical: The Series follows a little too closely in its predecessors steps to truly be the start of something new." Metacritic, which uses a weighted average, assigned a score of 64 out of 100 based on 16 critics, indicating "generally favorable reviews".

Accolades

Notes

References 

1
2019 American television seasons
2020 American television seasons